Shanmuganatha Pattanam is a small Nagarathar Village which is located near Devakottai.This village has its own history tends to be 175 years old or more. Though Shanmuganatha Pattanam is an interior village of Sivaganga district, it has got all major facilities such as schools up to higher secondary, post office, transport in frequent mode (auto, bus), and water facility.

Schools
 Nalla Karuppan Chettiar Elementary School
 V.N.T. Govt. Hr. Sec. School
 Ramasamy Elementary School

Government offices
 Post office
 Telephone exchange (Kumaravelur)

Temples
 Sri Siddhi Vinayagar Temple
 Sri Karumariyamman Temple
 Sri Muniswarar Temple
 Sri Thamburudaiya Ayyanar Temple
 Sri Naganathar Temple
 Sri Madurai Veeran Temple

References

Villages in Sivaganga district